Le Quartanier is a francophone publishing house founded in Montreal, Quebec in September 2002 by Éric de Larochellière and Christian Larouche. Le Quarantier distributes its books worldwide but principally in Canada, France and francophone countries.

Originally, Le Quartanier published exclusively exploratory poetry, but has diversified into general poetry, essays and fiction novels divided into four distinct collections:

Série QR
Phacochères
Erres Essais
La table des matières

The publishing house also launched its house journal "Le Quartanier" from 2003 to 2007. The journal was stopped after publication of seven issues. Le Quartanier then launched OVNI Magazine in 2008, a periodical consecrated to literature, the arts and cinema.

Authors

Gilles Amalvi
Ludovic Bablon
Ariane Bart
Claude Bernier
Fabrice Bothereau
Hervé Bouchard
Antoine Boute
Antoine Brea
Arno Calleja
André Carpentier
Philippe Charron
le collectif Cité Selon
Éric Clémens
Loge Cobalt
Kevin Davies
Hugo Duchesne
Alain Farah
Guillaume Fayard
Renée Gagnon
Bertrand Gervais
Mylène Lauzon
Bertrand Laverdure
David Leblanc
Alban Lefranc
Pierre Ménard
F.P. Meny
Christof Migone 
Marc-Antoine K. Phaneuf
Patrick Poulin
Martin Richet
Jocelyn Robert
Samuel Rochery
Steve Savage
Dauphin Vincent
Barrett Watten
Xki Zone
Christian Zorka

External links
 Official site

Book publishing companies of Canada